Cumalar (also, Çumalar) is a village and municipality in the Barda Rayon of Azerbaijan. It has a population of 581. But Barda's Best village is Ayrica

References

Populated places in Barda District